are a Japanese rock trio, formed in 2002 in Saitama Prefecture. The band's style resembles post-hardcore and progressive rock, math-rock, often incorporating rapid changes of tempo and mood framed in complex guitar melodies and technical drumming. They utilize both male and female vocals ranging from soft singing to loud wails and screams.

Biography 

Ling tosite Sigure was formed in 2002 in Saitama, Japan. TK (vocals, guitar) and 345 (vocals, bass) started first with NodaMEN (drums) then Pierre Nakano (drums) joined shortly, replacing Noda. The band released several demos before starting their own label, Nakano Records, and releasing their debut album #4. Their second album Inspiration is DEAD was released on August 22, 2007 following an EP Feeling Your UFO the previous year, giving the band increased popularity and exposure throughout Japan. They appeared in the Countdown music festival in 2007 and continued to tour on a regular basis.

On April 23, 2008, the band released their first single "Telecastic fake show", which charted in the Oricon Top 20. In July they participated in the Fuji Rock Festival and in August the Rising Sun Rock Festival. In December 2008, Ling tosite Sigure released the single "moment A rhythm", after signing to major label Sony Music. The single included an art book consisting of Kitajima's photography.

Their third album, Just a Moment, was released on May 15, 2009, from which "JPOP Xfile" was featured on Space Shower TV. In August they performed at the Summer Sonic Festival and toured throughout Japan. In 2010, the band performed a massive nationwide tour, "I Was Music", culminating at the high-profile Saitama Super Arena venue in the band's home city. In May, they traveled to England and played their first international shows in London and Brighton before returning to the studio to record new material.

The band released their fourth album Still a Sigure Virgin? on September 22, 2010. They went on their "Virgin Killer" tour from late October to early December. The first music video from the album, "I Was Music", aired on September 14. In 2011, the band continued to tour as TK released a film and photo book and Nakano released an instructional drum DVD.

On November 14, 2012, they released single titled "Abnormalize". The title song was used for the opening of the anime series Psycho-Pass. The song was performed on Music Station.

The band's 5th studio album I'mperfect was released on April 10, 2013. The band signed to specialized European record label JPU Records in June 2013 and released I'mperfect all across Europe.

The band released the single "Enigmatic Feeling" on November 5, 2014. The title song was used for the opening of the anime series Psycho-Pass 2.

On January 14, 2015, the band released another single, "Who What Who What", and their first compilation album Best of Tornado. Unlike their other singles, "Who What Who What" only contained one song, which was used for the anime movie Psycho-Pass: The Movie. The song was performed on Music Station. Best of Tornado featured remixed and remastered editions of their previous songs. There were 3 different releases of the album: the regular version, featuring one disc; the Tornado Edition, which contained 2 discs, the second having 11 music videos, and the Hyper Tornado Edition which contained 3 discs, the third being several demo tapes and audio of their live performances.

An EP titled Es or S was released on September 2, 2015. The limited edition featured a 7-inch LP, A-side playing "SOSOS" and the B-side being "Mirror Frustration".

On August 23, 2017, the band released the single "DIE meets HARD". The single featured a song made in collaboration with Koji Nakamura ("DIE meets HARD Koji Nakamura Remix"). The Limited Edition came with 2 discs; one containing 3 songs and the other containing their "DIE meets HARD" music video and a 15-minute podcast between the 3 members (titled DIE HARD radio on the disk). A 1-minute edit of the song was used as the opening for the drama series Shimokitazawa DIE HARD.

On November 17, 2017, the band's 6th studio album #5 was announced with a February 14, 2018 release date. This was the band's first album release in roughly 5 years. The limited-edition came with a DVD containing music videos for "Chocolate Passion" and "#5", as well as a second installment of DIE HARD radio, which once again featured a podcast between the three members. In addition, a nationwide tour (Rin to Shinku Tour 2018 "Five For You") was announced to accompany the album, starting March 3 at Kanazawa EIGHT HALL, and lasting 12 total performances.

On April 18, 2019, the band released their new song "laser beamer" digitally. The song was written for the first ever stage adaptation of the anime series Psycho-Pass entitled Psycho-Pass: Virtue and Vice.

On July 3, 2019, the band digitally released the single titled "Neighbormind / laser beamer" from which "Neighbormind" was later used as the main theme for the Japanese dub of the film Spider-Man: Far From Home.

Almost exactly 15 years after the release of #4 the band decided to release a remastered version on November 11, 2020 titled #4 -Retornado- (or #4 -Retornade-).

The band released a new single Perfake Perfect on January 20, 2021. The title's song was used as theme song of the second stage adaptation Psycho-Pass: Virtue and Vice 2 from the Psycho-Pass anime series. Few days before, on January 18, 2021 the Perfake Perfect Tour took its first place in KT Zepp Yokohama.

On May 11, 2022, the band released the new digital single "Tatsumaite senno" to celebrate their 20th anniversary.

On Sep 21st, "Marvelous Persona" was chosen as the opening theme for Line News Vision drama series, Joge Kankei.

On Nov 11th, Sigure announced their work-in-progress seventh studio album Last Aurorally, along with a promotional tour titled Aurora Is Mine. The album is planned to release in April 12th, 2023.

Band members 

Current members
 Tōru "TK" Kitajima ( born December 23, 1982) — guitar, vocals 
 Miyoko "345" Nakamura ( born April 1, 1983) — bass guitar, vocals 
 Masatoshi "Pierre" Nakano ( born July 18, 1980) — drums 

Former member
 Noda MEN (野田MEN) — drums

Timeline

Discography

Studio albums

Compilation album

Extended plays

Singles

Digital singles

Music videos

Tours and concerts

Japan 

 Sadistic Summer Tour (2004)
 Give Me Your Turbo Tour (2005)
 P_Rhythm Autumn Tour (2006)
 Dynamite Sexy Summer Oneman Tour (2007)
 Last A Moment Tour (2008)
 Fuji Rock Festival with Various Artists (2008)
 Rising Sun Rock Festival with Various Artists (2008)
 Tornado Z Tour (2009)
 Summer Sonic Festival with Various Artists (2009)
 I was music Tour (2010)
 The Smashing Pumpkins Extra Show with Ling tosite Sigure and 9mm Parabellum Bullet as supporting acts (2010)
 Virgin Killer Tour (2011)
 Alpha Beta+1 Tour (2011)
 Dear Perfect Tour (2013)
 Hyper Tornado Tour (2015)
 S.O.S Tour (2015)
 Five for you Tour (2018)
 Five for you – Vacuum the Hall Edition (2018)
Perfake Perfect Tour (2021)

Overseas 

 The Great Escape Festival in UK with Various Artists (2010)
 Japan Night in UK with Various Artists (2015)
Five for You – Beijing (2018)

Awards and nominations

References

External links 

 
 
 

2002 establishments in Japan
Japanese indie rock groups
Japanese musical trios
Japanese progressive rock groups
Musical groups established in 2002
Musical groups from Saitama Prefecture
Post-hardcore groups